Jerzy Klimaszewski (3 July 1903 – 23 March 1945) was a Polish actor. He was active in theatre and film between 1926 and 1938. During the Second World War, he was imprisoned in Auschwitz and Sachsenhausen concentration camps; he died in the latter in March 1945, only two months before the end of the war.

Selected filmography
Huragan (1928)
Janko muzykant (1930)
Szpieg w masce (1933)
Kazdemu wolno kochac (1933)
Jego wielka miłość (1936)
Jadzia (1936)
Amerykańska awantura (1936)
Dziewczyna szuka miłości (1938)

References

External links

1903 births
1945 deaths
People from Tomaszów Mazowiecki County
Polish male stage actors
Polish male film actors
20th-century Polish male actors
Polish civilians killed in World War II
Auschwitz concentration camp prisoners
Polish people who died in Nazi concentration camps
People who died in Sachsenhausen concentration camp